Mabini may refer to:

Places in the Philippines
 Mabini, Batangas, municipality
 Mabini, Bohol, municipality
 Mabini, Cagdianao, barangay in the province of Dinagat Islands
 Mabini, Davao de Oro, municipality
 Mabini, Pangasinan, municipality
 Mabini, Tubajon, barangay in the province of Dinagat Islands

People with the surname
Apolinario Mabini (1864–1903), Philippine revolutionary leader

See also
BRP Apolinario Mabini (PS-36), a vessel in the Philippine Navy
The Mabini Academy, a school in  Lipa City, Batangas, Philippines